The Australian Labor Party (Northern Territory Branch), commonly known as Territory Labor, is the Northern Territory branch of the Australian Labor Party. It has been the governing party of the Northern Territory since winning the 2016 election under Michael Gunner. It previously held office from 2001 to 2012.

History

The first Labor candidate from the Northern Territory—which was then represented by the Northern Territory seat in the South Australian House of Assembly—was Pine Creek miner and former City of Adelaide alderman James Robertson in 1905. The first Labor MP was Thomas Crush, who was elected at a 1908 by-election and accepted into the South Australian Labor caucus despite not having signed the Labor pledge. He was re-elected in 1910, and served until the Northern Territory formally separated from South Australia in 1911, resulting in the loss of the seat in state parliament. A non-voting federal seat in the Australian House of Representatives, the Division of Northern Territory, was established for the 1922 election, and was won by independent candidate and former union leader Harold George Nelson, who joined the Labor caucus after the election.

In March 1928, a general meeting of the North Australian Workers Union resolved to establish a Northern Territory branch of the Labor Party and elected an interim executive. In July 1928, it was reported that the federal secretary had requested that the South Australian branch instead form a Darwin branch. It was reported in October 1928 that affiliation with the South Australian branch had been granted, and that the South Australian state executive had re-endorsed Nelson to contest the 1929 election. An Alice Springs branch was established in 1947. The Northern Territory branch was upgraded to receive the status of a state branch in August 1967.

The Northern Territory Legislative Council was established in 1947 as a partly elected representative body with limited powers, with the Labor Party endorsing candidates from the first election. Labor members of the Legislative Council included Tom Bell, Eric Marks, Charles Orr, Len Purkiss, Tom Ronan, and Richard Ward

In 1974, the Legislative Council was replaced by the fully elected Northern Territory Legislative Assembly in preparation for self-governance. However, the 1974 election was disastrous for Labor, which failed to win a single seat. The party recovered to some extent at the 1977 election, winning six seats. However, over the next 24 years, it never came particularly close to winning government; it never won more than nine seats at an election and never held more than two seats in the Darwin/Palmerston area at any time.

As a result, Labor remained in opposition until 2001 election, when Clare Martin led the party to government for the first time primarily on the strength of a near-sweep of Darwin, including all seven seats in the northern part of the capital. Four years later, in 2005, Martin led Labor to one of the most comprehensive victories on record at the state or territory level, winning 19 out of 25 seats, the second-largest majority government in the history of the Territory. Martin retired in 2007 and was succeeded by Paul Henderson. Under Henderson, Labor won a third term with a reduced majority in 2008 before being defeated by the CLP at the 2012 election. After one term in opposition, Labor returned to power at the 2016 election. Under Michael Gunner, Labor won a landslide almost as massive as the one it won in 2005, with 18 seats, the third-largest majority government in the history of the Territory. Gunner was reelected in 2020 with a somewhat reduced mandate of 14 seats.

Leaders

 Richard Ward (1974)
 Jon Isaacs (September 1977 – November 1981)
 Bob Collins (November 1981 – August 1986)
 Terry Smith (August 1986 – November 1990)
 Brian Ede (November 1990 – April 1996)
 Maggie Hickey (April 1996 – February 1999)
 Clare Martin (February 1999 – November 2007)
 Paul Henderson (November 2007 – August 2012)
 Delia Lawrie (August 2012 – April 2015)
 Michael Gunner (April 2015 – May 2022)
 Natasha Fyles (May 2022 – present)

Election results
Note: this section only lists elections for the Northern Territory Legislative Assembly.

References

Northern Territory
Political parties in the Northern Territory